Tweez is the debut studio album by American rock band Slint and the only studio recording released before their disbandment. It was originally released on the label Jennifer Hartman Records in 1989 as the only record put out by the label, which was run by their friend, Jennifer Hartman. It is the only Slint album to feature bassist Ethan Buckler.

The album was reissued by Touch and Go Records in 1993 after the group's follow-up, Spiderland, began to generate a cult following.

Background
Tweez was recorded at Studiomedia in Evanston, Illinois, and was produced by Steve Albini.

All of the album's song titles are taken from the names of the band members' parents, with the exception of "Rhoda", which was named after drummer Britt Walford's dog: "Ron" and "Charlotte" are named for Walford's parents, "Nan Ding" and "Darlene" for guitarist David Pajo's, "Carol" and "Kent" for guitarist and vocalist Brian McMahan's and "Warren" and "Pat" for those of bassist Ethan Buckler.

On the vinyl version of the album, the individual sides of the record are labelled and given in the track listing as "Bemis" and "Gerber".

Artwork
The cover art for Tweez features a photo of a Saab 900 Turbo, with the Saab logo on the grille replaced with "Slint" and the "Turbo" logo replaced with the album's title. On the vinyl version of the album, both labels feature parodies of the Saab logo, with "Slint" replacing "Saab" and the name of either side of the album (Bemis and Gerber) replacing "Scania." Additionally, a figure can vaguely be seen sitting in the drivers side of the vehicle, through the windshield. This was years later revealed in the 2014 documentary Breadcrumb Trail to be fellow Louisville musician and friend of the band Will Oldham, wearing a crash helmet. On CD and cassette versions of the album, the message "This recording is meant to be listened to on vinyl." can be seen on the back.

Reception

The album has received generally mixed to positive reviews.

John Bush of AllMusic described the album as "a fine, if bizarre recording, often switching from bass-led rhythm to rhythm in the same song."

Track listing 
The vinyl sides are referred to as "Bemis" and "Gerber".

Personnel 
Slint

 David Pajo – guitar
 Brian McMahan – guitar, vocals
 Britt Walford – drums, vocals
 Ethan Buckler – bass guitar

Guest Musicians

 Edgar Blossom – vocals on "Warren"

Technical

 Steve Albini (credited as Some Fuckin Derd Niffer) – engineering
 Joe Oldham – cover photography
 Lisa Owen – cover design

References

External links 

 

1989 debut albums
Slint albums
Albums produced by Steve Albini
Touch and Go Records albums
Self-released albums